Histeroidea is a superfamily of beetles in the infraorder Staphyliniformia.

Characteristics
Characteristic to Histeroidea are an accessory posterior ridge (locking device) behind the hind margin and presence of medial loop and apical hinge of wing. The elytra are truncate with 1 or 2 abdominal segments visible. The abdominal 8th segment is completely invaginated in the 7th segment. Eachantenna has 8 (seldom 7) segments preceding a club of fused segments. The ventral body surface is glabrous.

Ecology 
Histeroids in general are predators. However, Sphaeritidae is believed to only be predatory in the larval stage, with its adults being saprophagous instead.

This superfamily occurs in various habitats. The Histeridae alone can be found in dung, carrion, fungi, leaf litter, in symbiosis with other animals (e.g. social insects), under tree bark or in galleries of wood-boring beetles.

Systematics
Some authors treat Histeroidea as a single family within the superfamily Hydrophiloidea (Hydrophiloidea sensu lato), as they seem to form a clade. Three extant families are currently recognized:
Histeridae (3900+ species)
Sphaeritidae (7 species)
Synteliidae (9 species)
Sphaeritidae and Synteiidae each contain just a single genus: Sphaerites and Syntelia, respectively. This makes both families monotypic.

The oldest fossils of the family are Cretohister and Antigracilus from the Early Cretaceous (Aptian) Yixian Formation of China, which are more closely related to Histeridae than the other two families.

References

External links
Tree of Life web project

 
Beetle superfamilies